Chlorurus gibbus, the heavybeak parrotfish, gibbus parrotfish or Red Sea steephead parrotfish, is a species of marine ray-finned fish, a parrotfish from the family Scaridae. It is found in the Red Sea.

Description
The solitary juveniles are marked with longitudinal black and white stripes, the adults are blue in colour with a green and purple sheen in the males and a yellow sheen in the females.

Distribution
Chlorurus gibbus is endemic to the Red Sea and the Gulf of Aqaba. It has not been recorded in the Gulf of Aden where the closely related species Chlorurus strongylocephalus has been recorded. A report of C. gibbus from Socotra requires verification.

Habitat and biology
The adults school over the outer reef where there is an abundant growth of algae. They graze on filamentous algae. They have been recorded as attaining 14 years of age. They are protogynous hermaphrodites and have a social structure consisting of harems  with a single dominant male. However, they are not territorial and will live and feed alongside peaceably with other species. The teeth of parrotfish are fused together to form a powerful beak which they use to graze on filamentous algae growing on dead coral, often found feeding among a cloud of sediment. They are oviparous and the male and female form a pair to spawn. During the night they create a bag from mucus and bubbles which provides protection from nocturnal predators.

Taxonomy
Chlorurus gibbus was first formally described as Scarus gibbus in 1829 by the German naturalist and explorer Eduard Rüppell (1794-1884), the type locality was given as Al Muwaylih, Tabuk Province in Saudi Arabia. When Swainson created the genus Chlorurus in 1839 he designated Scarus gibbus is its type species. C. gibbus along with C. strongylocephalus in the Indian Ocean and C. microrhinos in the west-central Pacific forms a species complex.

Human usage
Chlorurus gibbus is fished in the central Red Sea, in the Jeddah fish market it was shown to be a significant part of the parrotfish catch.

References

gibbus
Taxa named by Eduard Rüppell
Fish described in 1829